Pico do Areeiro (often wrongly written as Pico do Arieiro), at  high, is Madeira Island's third highest peak. From the top, visitors can look down on the clouds on most days. The air is fresh and clear and the sun is very bright. On a clear day it is possible to see the neighboring island of Porto Santo,  to the northeast. 

The footpath northwards towards Pico Ruivo is an important tourist attraction, with a daily average of 1000 tourists trekking on it.

The peak has in recent times become popular with cyclists making the ascent from Funchal. Many cycling publications and online lists usually claim that the climb from sea level to the summit at Areeiro is one of the toughest in the world with 1810 meters of climbing over a very short distance of 22 kilometres. 

There is easy road access to the summit, with a large car park, a restaurant and souvenir shop. In 2011, an Air Defence Radar Station of the Portuguese Air Force was built at the top of the mountain near the tourist facilities.

Climate
Pico do Areeiro has a cool Mediterranean climate, surprisingly wet for this type of climate due to the extreme precipitation it gets, a big part of it from drizzle and fog.

References

External links

Geography of Madeira
Mountains of Portugal
Tourist attractions in Madeira
Arieiro